The North Wales Coast FA Junior Challenge Cup is a football knockout tournament involving teams from in North Wales who play in leagues administered and associated with the North Wales Coast Football Association.

Previous winners
Information sourced from the North Wales Coast Football Association website.

1890s

1895–96: – Bangor
1896–97: – Buckley Victoria
1897–98: – Bangor
1898-99: – Colwyn Bay
1899–1900: – Flint reserves

1900s

1900–01: – Rhyl reserves
1901–02: – Llanrwst
1902–03: – Flint UAC
1903–04: – Conway
1904–05: – Bangor reserves
1905–06: – Greenfield and Holyhead
1906–07: – Rhyl Vics
1907–08: – Llanrwst
1908-09: – Llanrwst
1909–10: – Bagillt

1910s

1910–11: – Holyhead reserves
1911–12: – Menai Bridge
1912–13: – Glasinfryn
1913–14: – Menai Bridge
1914–15: – No competition - World War One
1915–16: – No competition - World War One
1916–17: – No competition - World War One
1917–18: – No competition - World War One
1918–19: – No competition - World War One– 
1919–20: – Bangor Athletic Reserves

1920s

1920–21: – Abergele
1921–22: – Glasinfryn
1922–23: – O’holt St David’s (Flint)
1923–24: – Abergele
1924–25: – Beaumaris
1925–26: – Llanrwst
1926–27: – Menai Bridge
1927–28: – Bethesda
1928-29: – Prestatyn
1929–30: – Menai Bridge

1930s

1930–31: – Mold Alexandra
1931–32: – Menai Bridge
1932–33: – Menai Bridge
1933–34: – Colwyn Bay Comrades
1934–35: – Llanberis
1935–36: – Llanberis
1936–37: – Shotton Athletic
1937–38: – Shotton Athletic
1938-39: – Bangor Normal College
1939–40: – Connah’s Quay Albion

1940s

1940–41: – No competition - World War Two
1941–42: – No competition - World War Two
1942–43: – No competition - World War Two
1943–44: – No competition - World War Two
1944–45: – No competition - World War Two
1945–46: – Mostyn YMCA
1946–47: – Menai Bridge
1947–48: – Menai Bridge
1948-49: – 31 TRA, Kinmel Camp
1949–50: – Amlwch Town

1950s

1950–51: – Connah’s Quay Albion
1951–52: – Connah’s Quay Albion
1952–53: – Greenfield United
1953–54: – Mostyn YMCA
1954–55: – Saltney Ferry
1955–56: – Amlwch Town
1956–57: – Newborough
1957–58: – Newborough
1958-59: – Gwalchmai
1959–60: – Mostyn YMCA

1960s

1960–61: – Gwalchmai
1961–62: – Gwydyr Rovers
1962–63: – Brynsiencyn
1963–64: – Llanberis
1964–65: – Llanberis
1965–66: – Llanberis
1966–67: – Llechid Celts
1967–68: – Machno United
1968-69: – Llechid Celts
1969–70: – Rhyl Wanderers

1970s

1970–71: – Llangoed & District
1971–72: – Mostyn YMCA
1972–73: – Mostyn YMCA
1973–74: – Mostyn YMCA
1974–75: – Llandegfan
1975–76: – Llanfairpwll
1976–77: – Holywell Town
1977–78: – Llanrug United
1978–79: – Llanrug United
1979–80: – Bethesda Athletic

1980s

1980–81: – Llanfairpwll
1981–82: – Hawarden Rangers
1982–83: – Llanfairpwll
1983–84: – Rhydymwyn
1984–85: – Llanerch-y-medd
1985–86: – Sychdyn
1986–87: – Bro Goronwy
1987–88: – Holyhead Town
1988-89: – Llanfairfechan Town
1989–90: – Connah’s Quay Albion

1990s

1990–91: – Gwalchmai
1991–92: – Llangefni Town reserves
1992–93: – Gwalchmai
1993–94: – Deiniolen
1994–95: – Machno United
1995–96: – Gwalchmai
1996–97: – Amlwch Town
1997–98: – Glan Conwy
1998–99: – Abergele
1999–2000: – Nefyn United

2000s

2000–01: – Nantlle Vale
2001–02: – Bethel
2002–03: – Castle Rhuddlan
2003–04: – Llangoed & District
2004–05: – Llanystumdwy
2005–06: – Caernarfon Borough
2006–07: – Beaumaris Town 
2007–08: – Barmouth & Dyffryn United
2008–09: – Trearddur Bay United
2009–10: – Mynydd Llandegai

2010s

2010–11: – Point of Ayr
2011–12: – Morawelon
2012–13: – CPD Y Felinheli
2013–14: – CPD Y Felinheli
2014–15: – Llandudno Albion
2015–16: – Llanfairpwll reserves
2016–17: – Bro Goronwy
2017–18: – Nefyn United
2018–19: – Bro Goronwy
2019–20: – No competition - Covid-19 pandemic

2020s

2020–21: – No competition - Covid-19 pandemic
2021–22: – Cemaes Bay

References

Football cup competitions in Wales
County Cup competitions
Football in Wales
1895 establishments in Wales